Argonemertes hillii is a species of nemertean worms in the family Prosorhochmidae that is endemic to Australia, and is found east of the Great Dividing Range in northern New South Wales and southern Queensland. It inhabits in damp woodlands, dry sclerophyll forests and tropical and subtropical rainforests, and is usually found under logs.

References

Prosorhochmidae
Endemic fauna of Australia
Animals described in 1924